Major General Paul Anthony Edward Nanson  (born 10 May 1965) is a British Army officer who served as Commander 7th Armoured Brigade, Commandant of the Royal Military Academy Sandhurst and General Officer Commanding Recruiting and Initial Training Command.

Early life and education
Nanson was born in Ormskirk, Lancashire, England. He was educated at Merchant Taylors' Boys' School, Crosby and the Royal Military Academy Sandhurst.

Military career
Nanson was commissioned into the Royal Regiment of Fusiliers in January 1986. He became commanding officer of the 1st Battalion Royal Regiment of Fusiliers in 2006 and was deployed to Iraq. He went on to be chief of staff for 1st (United Kingdom) Armoured Division in Germany in 2008, commander of the 7th Armoured Brigade in March 2011 and Director (Army) at the Joint Services Command and Staff College in April 2014. 

After that he became Commandant of the Royal Military Academy Sandhurst in September 2015. Nanson was given the additional appointment of General Officer Commanding Recruiting and Initial Training Command in 2018, a post which he has continued in after finishing his 5-year term at the Royal Military academy, Sandhurst as commandant. Nanson retired from the British Army on 4 November 2020.

Honours and decorations
Nanson was appointed Commander of the Order of the British Empire (CBE) for distinguished services in Afghanistan on 26 February 2015 and Companion of the Order of the Bath (CB) in the 2020 New Year Honours.

References

External links

|-

1966 births
Living people
Royal Regiment of Fusiliers officers
Military personnel of the Bosnian War
British Army personnel of the Gulf War
British military personnel of The Troubles (Northern Ireland)
Military personnel from Lancashire
People educated at Merchant Taylors' Boys' School, Crosby
British Army major generals
British Army personnel of the Iraq War
British Army personnel of the War in Afghanistan (2001–2021)
Commandants of Sandhurst
Commanders of the Order of the British Empire
Companions of the Order of the Bath